Antonio Poli is an Italian operatic tenor. He debuted at The Royal Opera as Cassio in Otello in 2012, and also sung Don Ottavio in Don Giovanni in 2013.

References

Living people
Italian operatic tenors
21st-century Italian  male  opera singers
Year of birth missing (living people)